Swathi Chinukulu  is an Indian Telugu Language soap opera that aired on ETV Telugu. It premiered on 9 September 2013 and ended on 19 September 2020 completing 2126 episodes.

Plot 
Mythili and Neelaveni are two young women with a strong bond. They live vastly different lives in opposite ends of the world and go through various struggles. Mythili a Joyous young lady has been migrated to Europe for job. Her vibrant experiences with her boss Panigrahi and his way made her fall in love with him. Neelaveni a village girl born and brought up among sentimental relationships struggling with her love feel. The story deals about these two ladies experiences and lives.

Cast

References

External links 

Telugu-language television shows
2013 Indian television series debuts
2020 Indian television series endings
Indian television soap operas
ETV Telugu original programming